A weapon is a tool for hunting or fighting.

Weapon or Weapons may also refer to:

Music
Weapon (band), a Canadian blackened death metal band
Weapon (album), a 2013 album by industrial band Skinny Puppy
Weapon (EP), an EP by Six Finger Satellite
Weapons (album), an album by Lostprophets
"Weapon" (song), a 2002 song by Matthew Good
"weapon", a 2021 song by Against the Current
"Weapons", a 2009 song by Jars of Clay from the album The Long Fall Back to Earth
"Weapons", a 2023 song by Ava Max from the album Diamonds & Dancefloors

Others
Weapon (Final Fantasy), creatures from the Final Fantasy series
Weapon (novel), by Robert Mason
Weapon (biology), traits used by males to fight for access to mates
Weapon-class destroyer,  class of destroyers built for the British Royal Navy towards the end of World War II
 Weapons (film), a 2007 American teenage crime drama

See also
Military technology and equipment